The Iskandar Malaysia Bus Rapid Transit (IMBRT)  is a proposed bus rapid transit system to be built in and around Iskandar Malaysia, Johor, Malaysia. It will consist of trunk, direct, and feeder bus rapid transit corridors.

The Brisbane BRT will be a bus rapid transit model for the development based on the feasibility study to be implemented in Iskandar Malaysia.

History
As the population of Iskandar Malaysia was expected to grow double in 2025 from 1.5 million people when it was established in 2006, IMBRT was proposed to cater the transportation needs for the residents in the area. This led to the first conceptualization of the project in 2009 that aimed to combine the speed and reliability of the light rail transit (LRT) with the affordability of a conventional bus system. The concept aimed to use high-capacity buses shuttling along the dedicated bus lanes on three main routes connecting Johor Bahru to industries and residential areas in Tebrau, universities and small and medium-sized enterprises in Skudai and new growth areas in Nusajaya. The buses will be air-conditioned with Wi-Fi on board that run on clean energy at regular intervals, cutting waiting and travelling times for commuters while reducing pollution and traffic jams.

Project launch
Late March 2016, the IMBRT project received a green light from the government and expected to take off on 2017. The project was set to be done in three phases with the first phase scheduled to complete in 2021. Once completed, the BRT system was expected cover almost 90% of Iskandar Malaysia, up from the then 39% coverage.

On 7 October 2017, the project was launched by the then Malaysia's Prime Minister Najib Razak at the Progressive Johor Expo in Kota Iskandar. The BRT system was set to be developed at a cost of RM2.56 billion that would be funded by the Federal government for RM1 billion while the remaining funds would be financed through public-private partnership initiative. The system was said to have the elements of light rail transit or metro that would make it quicker than regular bus services. The prime minister ensured that the BRT system would be linked to the Rapid Transit System (RTS), the High Speed Rail (HSR) and intercity bus service. The project was then expected to be operational by 2021 and have a route spanning 51 km and 39 stations.

Progress
The public inspection for the project was started in November 2017 to get the feedback from the public and continued to 2018 along with development planning, land acquisitions and stations design to focus throughout the year. The routes were later updated to span over 300 km, of which 50 km were trunk routes while the rest would be feeder routes. The construction work was set to start on the first quarter on 2021 while the completion date for the first phase was push back to end of 2021.

Upon the change of government due to 2018 general election, the new Pakatan Harapan state government confirmed that they are still committed to continuing the project and be given due priority by the Federal government with Johor Bahru-Kota Iskandar to be first route considered for implementation. As of Mar 2021, the construction was again pushed back to the first quarter 2022 with the service to start on 2023.

As the vehicle of the project arrived in January 2021, the bus pilot testing programme of the system set to be launched on 8 April 2021. They will pass by Horizon Hills and Anjung in Medini.

IMBRT Pilot Testing Programme
A three -month pilot testing program was launched on April 8, 2021, in Medini, Iskandar Puteri.
As a pilot test, nine bus suppliers were involved in demonstrations of the use of the latest green bus technology that uses electricity or biodiesel. The buses tested ranged in size from 6 meters to 32 meters, and the actual test was held along the route in Iskandar Puteri corridor.

Bi-articulated bus for trunk services

In January 2021, a LiDAR guided bi-articulated bus for IMBRT arrived in Johor from China. The guided buses that will be used for this project is an Autonomous Rail Rapid Transit (ART) type that was imported by Mobilus Sdn Bhd, a 51:49 joint venture company established between Eccaz Sdn. Bhd. and CRRC Urban Traffic Co Ltd, a member of CRRC Group. Malaysia will be the first country in the region to potentially adopt this technology.

The ART is a multi-carriages that is equipped with sensors that read the painted tracks marking on the road, enabling it to automatically navigate its own route while travelling up to 70 km per hour and carrying more than 100 passengers per carriages. The capacity of an ART vehicle is expandable to up to five carriages. It is considered as a medium capacity transit system for urban passenger transport using leading edge technology and allows for higher passenger capacity at a lower cost of implementation when compared to traditional light rail systems. During the pilot test, the guided bus used stored energy on electricity to operates. This is to find out the vehicle sustainability to suit on the hot and humid conditions of Malaysian weather.

Single-deck bus for direct and feeder services
A total of 5 single deck buses have participated in this program where 4 buses use electricity while only 1 Scania K250UB bus uses biodiesel. The electric bus models involved are Putra-NEDO EV, Edison Motors New e-FIBIRD, Skywell NJL6101EV and CRRC CSR6105GLEV1-1.

Route

For the first phase of IMBRT, the 51 km route will consist of 19 stations in Tebrau, 13 in Skudai and seven in Iskandar Puteri.

Trunks service corridors

Direct service

Feeder service

See also 
 List of bus rapid transit systems
 Johor–Singapore RTS
 KTM ETS
 Bi-articulated bus
 CRRC Autonomous Rail Rapid Transit
 Bombardier Guided Light Transit
 Van Hool ExquiCity bi-articulated bus

References

External links 
 Iskandar Malaysia Bus Rapid Transit Official Website
 Iskandar Regional Development Authority Official Website
 Perbadanan Pengangkutan Awam Johor Official Website

Bus transport in Malaysia
Transport in Johor